Promession is an idea of how to dispose human remains by way of freeze drying. The concept of promession was developed by Swedish  biologist Susanne Wiigh-Mäsak, who derived the name from the Italian word for "promise" (promessa).  She founded Promessa Organic AB in 1997 to commercially pursue her idea. The company went bankrupt in 2015 without being able to produce a functioning facility. The idea of promession is questioned and not a functional method according to critics.

Process

The idea of promession involves five steps:
 Coffin separation: the body is placed into the chamber
 Cryogenic freezing: liquid nitrogen at −196 °C crystallizes the body
 Vibration: the body is disintegrated into particles within minutes
 Freeze drying: particles are freeze dried in a drying chamber, leaving approximately 30% of the original weight
 Metal separation: any metals (e.g., tooth amalgam, artificial hips, etc.) are removed, either by magnetism or by sieving. The dry powder is placed in a biodegradable casket which is interred in the top layers of soil, where aerobic bacteria decompose the remains into humus in as little as 6–12 months.

Criticism 
Promession as a functional method is questioned. No facility for promession has been built or put into service. Critics argue that there is a physical impossibility to atomize a freeze dried human body in this way.

Current status
The company was liquidated 2015 without being able to produce a functioning module or facility.

See also
 Alkaline hydrolysis (death custom)
 Natural burial

References

External links
 http://www.promessa.se Promessa Website

Death customs
Biodegradable waste management
1997 introductions
Italian words and phrases